Jacques de Révigny or Jacobus de Ravanis (1230s-1296) was a French jurist. The Italian jurist and poet Cino da Pistoia said of Jacques de Révigny that there was no cleverer debater in the world.

Life
Born some time between 1230 and 1240, Jacque de Révigny studied law under Jean de Monchy, Guichard de Langres and Simon de Paris at the University of Orléans. He became archdeacon of Toul, and in 1289 became Bishop of Verdun. He died in 1296.

References

1230s births
1296 deaths
French legal scholars
Bishops of Verdun
13th-century French jurists